"Heart Trouble" is a song written by Dave Gibson and Kent Robbins, and recorded by American country music artist Steve Wariner.  It was released in April 1985 as the second single from the album One Good Night Deserves Another.  The song reached #8 on the Billboard Hot Country Singles & Tracks chart.

Chart performance

References

1985 singles
1984 songs
Steve Wariner songs
Songs written by Kent Robbins
Song recordings produced by Tony Brown (record producer)
Song recordings produced by Jimmy Bowen
Songs written by Dave Gibson (American songwriter)
MCA Records singles